The 2023 Montana State Bobcats football team will represent Montana State University as a member of the Big Sky Conference during the 2023 NCAA Division I FCS football season. The Bobcats are led by third-year head coach Brent Vigen and play their home games at Bobcat Stadium in Bozeman, Montana.

Previous season

The Bobacts finished the 2022 season with an overall record of 12–2 and a mark of 8–0 in conference play to place in a tie for first in the Big Sky. They lost to South Dakota State 39–18 in the NCAA Division I Semifinal

Schedule

References

Montana State
Montana State Bobcats football seasons
Montana State Bobcats football